Aceso or Akeso was the Greek goddess of the healing process.

Family 
Aceso was the daughter of Asclepius and  Epione, sister of Iaso, Hygieia, Panacea, and Aegle.

Mythology 

Unlike her sister Panacea (Cure-All), she represented the process of a curing rather than the cure itself. Her male counterpart was Acesis (Akesis). In Greek sculptural reliefs, Aceso appears alongside her father Asclepius and sisters Hygeia, Panacea and Iaso.

References

Greek goddesses
Health goddesses
Children of Asclepius